The 1936 Villanova Wildcats football team represented Villanova University as an independent during the 1936 college football season. Led by first-year head coach Maurice J. "Clipper" Smith, the Wildcats compiled a record of 7–2–1.

Schedule

References

Villanova
Villanova Wildcats football seasons
Villanova Wildcats football